Southwestern College is a public community college in Chula Vista, California. Founded in 1961, Southwestern College serves approximately 19,000 students annually.

History 
Current enrollment at all locations exceeds 19,000 students.

Of the more than 1,100 community colleges nationwide, Southwestern College consistently places in the top 100 in the number of associate degrees conferred. The college mascot is the Jaguar, changed from an Apache amid local and national concerns about using Native American peoples as mascots.

Academics 
The campus is a feeder school for students hoping to transfer to the two local public universities, University of California, San Diego and San Diego State University, and also many other private institutions.

Athletics
Southwestern College is in the Pacific Coast Athletic Conference and competes in 11 sports which include:
Baseball
Basketball
Football
Cross Country
Soccer
Softball
Tennis
Track and Field
Water Polo
Volleyball
Swim and Dive

Southwestern College's football stadium hosts Bonita Vista High School's football games.

The campus has many state of the art athletic facilities including:
 artificial turf football field 
- artificial turf half football field 
 baseball stadium
- dirt track
- soccer field 
- softball field 
- Football stadium with weight room looking over the field 
- brand new indoor swimming pool
- basketball gym
- Five full-size tennis courts

During the week and weekends these fields double as youth soccer fields from ages 6–18.

Notable alumni
Brian Bilbray, former Congressman
 Ammar Campa-Najjar (born 1989), Democratic politician
John Fox, professional football coach
John Jaso, professional baseball player
Dan La Botz, Socialist activist/politician, historian, labor leader
Ogemdi Nwagbuo, professional football player
Ookay, singer and DJ
Rafael Peralta, Navy Cross recipient
Oliver Ross, professional football player
J. Michael Straczynski, writer and television producer
Julieta Venegas, singer
Yvonne Venegas, photographer
Tom Waits, singer, songwriter, musician
Dominik Mysterio, professional wrestler

References

External links
Official website

California Community Colleges
Universities and colleges in San Diego County, California
Education in Chula Vista, California
South Bay (San Diego County)
Educational institutions established in 1961
1961 establishments in California
Schools accredited by the Western Association of Schools and Colleges
Two-year colleges in the United States